Glück unterwegs  is a 1944 Germany-Czechoslovak musical comedy film, directed by Miroslav Cikán. It stars  O.W. Fischer, Max Gülstorff, and Kurt Hoffmann-Leydorff.

References

External links
 

1944 films
Films of Nazi Germany
1940s German-language films
German musical comedy films
Czechoslovak musical comedy films
1944 musical comedy films
Films directed by Miroslav Cikán
Czech musical comedy films
German black-and-white films
Czechoslovak black-and-white films
1940s Czech films